Montfortian (locally Mofers or Mofertaans) is a Central Limburgish dialect spoken in the Dutch town of Montfort. It is closely related to the dialects spoken in Echt, Sint Joost, Hingen, Peij, Slek (Echt-Susteren, Limburg) and Koningsbosch.

There are three main variants with only minor differences:
 Mofertaans (spoken in Aan de Berg and Montfort)
 Pötbrooks (spoken in Echterbosch, Maria-Hoop and Putbroek)
 Räötjes (spoken in Reutje, often grouped with the dialect of Sint Odiliënberg)

Phonology

Consonants 

Labiovelar  may also be realised as bilabial .

The exact realization of  depends on the speaker.

Before rounded vowels, all of the consonants exhibit some degree of labialization.

Vowels

Monophthongs 

  only occurs in unstressed syllables.
  only occurs in loanwords from English.

Grammar 

Like most Limburgish dialects, the grammar of Montfortian is very irregular and less simplified than the Dutch is.

Articles 
There are two groups of articles: definite articles and indefinite articles. When referring to one particular person or item, the definite article is used (English the) In plural, like in English, there is no indefinite article and the indefinite forms consist of nouns unaccompanied by any article. Articles are conjugated by gender, bdht-vowel-rule, grammatical case and quantity. The form of the article could also be determined by whether a preposition is used.

The bdht-vowel-rule is a grammatical rule of Limburgish that influences the conjugation of the articles and adjectives. Words starting with b, d, h, t or a vowel put an extra 'n' to the article or adjective where possible. The high tree → d'n  but the fat man → . This extra 'n' is called naoklank (stress) in Limburgish.

The numeral ein (one) and negative indefinite article gein (no, not a, not any) are conjugated the same as 'n (a) So the nominative will be conjugated as einen, eine, ein, ein, ein, ei and geinen, geine, gein, gein, gein, gei. gein could also be gèn: gènnen, gènne, gèn, gèn, gèn, gèn, but then the neutral unstressed nominative will have a final 'n'.

Umlaut 
Verbs, nouns and adjectives use an umlaut. Standard umlauts are:

Nouns 
Nouns are declined by quantity, size and grammatical case. There are several conjugations for those. Though most grammatical cases got out of use, nominative, locative and genitive still exist. Dative is still attested in De Vastelaoves Gezèt (ca. 1900) but it already contained the accusative of which only a few fragments are found (ca. 1830) Montfortian nouns have a so-called diminutive,  (from oer) means little hour. Nouns only possess a plural and not a dual (like the verb imperative and some personal pronouns) Plurals (and also diminutives) always use an umlaut where possible (see also Umlaut above) Also ablauts can occur, like  (blood → "bloods") blood is one of the few exceptions of nouns which don't use an umlaut. If blood was regular, the plural would be . Nouns are masculine, feminine or neutral.

There are over 20 different regular conjugations, but these are the six most used. Please note that only the nominative, genitive and locative are still in use today. Accusative and dative have been replaced by the nominative. The fifth conjugation uses tonality, singular is drag tone, plural is push tone. Also note the ablaut of the first conjugation at the dative singular and locative.

The first conjugation group also contains "irregular" words like hoes → hoeze (house) and doef → doeve (dove)

Loanwords 
Historically, Montfortian and most other Limburgish dialects have borrowed hundreds of words from French (during the First French Empire). These words nowadays have totally been adapted to the difficult noun (and verb) systems of Montfortian.  (from French ) means mess. It has totally been adapted to the system and now belongs to the first conjugation. It even has an ablaut at the locative,  (mess) →  (movement towards the mess)

Some modern-day loanwords, especially those from English, may confuse people. Some people pronounce  (singular) with drag tone and put it in the fifth group, whereas others use a push tone. Computer with push tone can therefore mean both one computer and more computers, depending on the speaker. Overall speaking, English loanwords have a push tone and are put in the first or sixth conjugation group, depending on whether an umlaut is possible. Computer with a push tone in the singular will have the following diminutive: .

Diminutive 
In general, diminutives are formed by adding  to the root and using an umlaut where possible. . Words ending on j, t or d have  as suffix. . Plurals always take -s, .

Sometimes only the diminutive has survived, while the root got out of use. The original form can then be reconstructed. For example, the word  (little bread) does not have a root anymore. Modern Montfortian still has the word  but its meaning has shifted from normal bread to bread specifically from rye made in Limburg (or Brabant)

Numerals 
Montfortian uses a decimal numeral system, without octal traces like many other European languages. There are only a few vigesimal traces left.

The cardinal numerals from 21 to 99 (apart from the tens) are constructed in a regular way, by adding -èn- (and) and the name of the appropriate multiple of ten to the name of the units position. (As in German, the last written digit is actually pronounced first):

 28 ach-èn-twintjig (literally "eight and twenty")
 83 drie-èn-achtig
 99 nege-n-èn-neugetig (-n is added for the sound)
100 is hóngerdj, 200 twieëhóngerdj, 300 driehóngerdj and so on.

Numerals between 101 and 999 are constructed as follows:

 112 hóngerdj-èn-twèlf
 698 zèshóngerdj-èn-ach-èn-neugetig ("six hundred and eight and ninety")
The same system used for naming the hundreds applies to the higher base numbers that are powers of ten. Limburgish dialects always use the long scale system, like Dutch.

 1 000 
 1 000 000 
 1 000 000 000 
 1 000 000 000 000 
 1 000 000 000 000 000 
Unlike Dutch, the cardinal numerals of numbers greater than 1000 are not grouped in "multiples of 1000". This would be unnecessary because -èn- (and) is always added. 117 000 000 is written and pronounced as hóngerdjènzevetiëenmiljoen, without glottal stop. When hóngerdj-èn-zevetiëenmiljoen is written and pronounced, it means 100 + 17 000 00 which is 17 000 100, though normally 17 000 100 would be pronounced as zevetieënmiljoen-èn-hóngerdj.

Verbs 
Many verbs are formed using compounds, like mit (with) + gaon (to go) =  (to join) Because most compounded verbs use irregular verbs in its compound, a large number of verbs is irregular. Because of the t-deletion it's very difficult to find a regular conjugation of the verbs. The following examples of the third person singular could all be seen as regular conjugations: hae kaltj (he talks, from kalle)  hae sprèk (he speaks, from spraeke) hae wèt (he knows, from weite) hae löp (he walks, from loupe)  (he falls, from valle) hae mót (he has to/should have to, from mótte) and hae kaok (he cooks, from kaoke) Apart from this, many verbs are strong (to fold, bakke - beek - gebakke, to bake, weite - wus - geweite/gewus, to know and loupe - leep - geloupe, to walk) or totally irregular like höbbe (to have, hae haet) zeen (to be, hae is) zeen (to see, hae zuutj) gaon (to go, hae geitj) and so on.

Some conjugations might have another conjugation when the word order is changed. That's why both SV (subject - verb) and VS (verb - subject) are shown below. At least seven regular conjugations exist.

One of the strangest things of the verbs is the ènkelzief (inclusive) It is a compound of a root and -em (kalle → kallem) It is often said that -em derives from dem (him) kallem means dare to talk and is used the same way as the imperative. Doe (thou) can be used then to put pressure on the person. For example:
 Ópstankem èn kallem-doe!
 (You!) Dare to stand up and dare to talk! (ópstankem → ópstaon)

 First conjugation 
This is the second largest group. All regular weak umlautless verb roots ending on j, l, n, r, t and w (without t-deletion)kalle, to talk, to chat

 Second conjugation 
This is a small group. All regular strong umlaut-having verb roots ending on -aeV.braeke, to break

 Third conjugation 
This is a small group. All regular weak umlaut-having verb roots ending on -eiV.zweite, to sweat

 Fourth conjugation 
This is the largest group. All regular weak umlautless verb roots ending in b, ch, d, f, g, k, p, and s (with t-deletion)
kaoke, to cook

Fifth conjugation 
This is the third largest group.
doupe, to baptise

Sixth conjugation 
This is the fourth largest group. All regular weak umlaut-having verb roots ending on -aV. All regular weak umlaut-having verb roots ending on -aaV use -aeV instead of -eV.
bevalle, to enjoy

Seventh conjugation 
The size of this group is unknown. It is often seen as a part of the first conjugation. All regular weak umlautless verb roots ending on -m.
keime, to comb (your hair)

References

Sources 
 Bakkes, Pierre (2007): Mofers Waordebook.  

Central Limburgish dialects
Culture of Limburg (Netherlands)
Roerdalen